Matt Catalano (born 20 February 1958) is a Canadian athlete. He competed in the men's shot put at the 1984 Summer Olympics.

References

1958 births
Living people
Athletes (track and field) at the 1984 Summer Olympics
Canadian male shot putters
Olympic track and field athletes of Canada
Place of birth missing (living people)